Erindale Road is a connector road in the northern suburbs of Perth, Western Australia, providing residents of the suburbs of Hamersley and Warwick with a connection to Reid Highway and Mitchell Freeway. The road is a dual carriageway with two lanes in each direction for most of its length, and continues from Warwick Road as Cockman Road through Greenwood, and from the Gwelup end as North Beach Road.

History
Historically, the part north of Balcatta Road was known as Allen Street (Road No.5), which continued diagonally to meet Wanneroo Road near present-day Culloton Crescent, and the part south of Balcatta Road was known as Odin Road, and was continuous with Odin Drive. Prior to the construction of the freeway through the area in 1984, Odin Road continued through the Karrinyup Road intersection to Innaloo along present-day Odin Road. When the route shields were introduced to Perth in 1986, Erindale Road was assigned State Route 77.

Description
Erindale Road passes the eastern end of the Centro Warwick regional shopping centre and is one of the two main roads (along with Balcatta Road) within the Balcatta light industrial area. Until the upgrade of the Reid Highway/Mitchell Freeway interchange, Erindale Road also carried all city-bound traffic from Hamersley and Warwick.

In peak periods, parts of the road are clogged with traffic, and the road is a reference point on Perth radio traffic reports.

Major intersections

  Warwick Road (State Route 81),  and  – to 
 Beach Road, Warwick and Hamersley – to 
  Balcatta Road (State Route 78), Balcatta
  Mitchell Freeway (State Route 2): southbound entry & northbound exit, Balcatta and Gwelup – to 
  North Beach Road (State Route 77 west), Gwelup

See also

References 

Roads in Perth, Western Australia
City of Stirling